Karim Ben Cheïkh (born 19 March 1977) is a Tunisia-born French politician who has represented the ninth constituency for French residents overseas in the National Assembly since 2022.

See also 

 List of deputies of the 16th National Assembly of France

References 

Living people
1977 births
Members of Parliament for French people living outside France

Génération.s politicians
Deputies of the 16th National Assembly of the French Fifth Republic
Pantheon-Sorbonne University alumni
Sciences Po alumni
Tunisian emigrants to France